Elizabeth City Regional Airport  is a joint civil-military public and military use airport located three nautical miles (6 km) southeast of the central business district of Elizabeth City, in Pasquotank County, North Carolina, United States. The airport, on the shore of the Pasquotank River, is also known as Elizabeth City-Pasquotank County Regional Airport or ECG Regional Airport. It is included in the National Plan of Integrated Airport Systems for 2011–2015, which categorized it as a general aviation facility.

The airport opened in 1972 and is shared with and owned by the U.S. Coast Guard. The military portion of the facility, known as Coast Guard Base Elizabeth City and Coast Guard Air Station Elizabeth City, operates HC-130J Hercules and MH-60T Jayhawk aircraft.

Facilities and aircraft 
Elizabeth City Regional Airport covers an area of 850 acres (344 ha) at an elevation of 12 feet (4 m) above mean sea level. It has two runways with asphalt and concrete surfaces: 10/28 is 7,217 by 150 feet (2,200 x 46 m) and 1/19 is 4,518 by 150 feet (1,377 x 46 m).

For the 12-month period ending August 19, 2009, the airport had 60,120 aircraft operations, an average of 164 per day: 73% military, 26% general aviation, and 1% air taxi. At that time there were 42 aircraft based at this airport: 57% single-engine, 31% military, 10% multi-engine, and 2% helicopter.

References

External links 

 Elizabeth City Regional Airport, official site
  at North Carolina DOT airport guide
 Aerial image as of March 1993 from USGS The National Map
 
 

Airports in North Carolina
Transportation in Pasquotank County, North Carolina
Buildings and structures in Pasquotank County, North Carolina